Fairfax Recordings was a record label and recording studio based in Van Nuys, California. Founded by engineer Kevin Augunas and Neil Schield, owner of the former Origami Vinyl record store in Echo Park, California.

Fairfax Recordings leased Sound City Studios when it closed to the public in 2011, operating there until Sound City Studios reopened in 2017.

The company was best known for its collection of vintage studio recording equipment and instruments. The studio utilized analog recording equipment and techniques and experimented with recording directly to vinyl, bypassing the mix-down process entirely.

References 

American record labels